Robert Maire Smyllie (1893 – 11 September 1954), known as Bertie Smyllie, was editor of The Irish Times from 1934 until his death in 1954.

Smyllie was born in Glasgow where his father was a Scottish journalist, who later moved to Sligo as editor of the Sligo Times. Smyllie was educated at Sligo Grammar School and entered Trinity College, Dublin in 1912. Working as a vacation tutor to an American boy in Germany at the start of World War I, he was detained in Ruhleben internment camp, near Berlin, during the war. As an internee, he was involved in drama productions with other internees.

On returning to Ireland, he reported on the Versailles Treaty for The Irish Times, then edited by John E. Healy. He contributed to the still ongoing "Irishman's Diary" column of the paper from 1927. In 1934, he was  appointed editor of the paper, in succession to Healy. He established a non-partisan profile and a modern Irish character for the erstwhile ascendancy paper; for example, he dropped "Kingstown Harbour" for "Dún Laoghaire". He was assisted by Alec Newman and Lionel Fleming, recruited Patrick Campbell  and enlisted Flann O'Brien to write his thrice-weekly column "Cruiskeen Lawn" as Myles na gCopaleen.

Further reading
 Mr. Smyllie, Sir, by Tony Gray, Gill & Macmillan Ltd, 1991, 
 Irish Media: A Critical History Since 1922, by John Horgan, Routledge, 1991, (pages 37,39,44–45,48, 62)
 Propaganda, Censorship and Irish Neutrality in the Second World War, by Robert Cole, Edinburgh University Press, 2006, (pages 26,37,45,59,77,87,104,138,144,176,183)

External links
 Mr. Smyllie, Sir  - memoir of Smyllie by Patrick Campbell

1893 births
1954 deaths
Alumni of Trinity College Dublin
People from Sligo (town)
The Irish Times editors
People educated at Sligo Grammar School
World War I civilian detainees held by Germany